Cazals was a six-piece Indie rock band from London, England. Formed in 2003, in East London. They toured with Babyshambles and Daft Punk. In 2007, they signed to French label Kitsuné Music. Their debut album What Of Our Future was released in June, 2008. They announced their split up in November 2009.

Discography

Albums
What Of Our Future (2008)

Singles
"Beat Me To The Bone"(2004)
"Poor Innocent Boys" (2005)
"Comfortable Silence" (2006)
"To Cut A Long Story Short" (2007)
"Life Is Boring" (2008)
"Somebody Somewhere" (2008)

British indie rock groups
English alternative rock groups
Kitsuné artists